The Martian Way and Other Stories is a 1955 collection of four science fiction stories (3 novelettes and one novella  by American writer Isaac Asimov, previously published in 1952 and 1954.  Although single-author story collections generally sell poorly, The Martian Way and Other Stories did well enough that Doubleday science fiction editor Walter I. Bradbury was willing to publish a second collection, Earth Is Room Enough, in 1957.

Contents
 "The Martian Way", novelette
 "Youth", novelette
 "The Deep", novelette
 "Sucker Bait", novella

Reception
Groff Conklin praised the collection as "an excellent introduction to the style and to the imagination of one of science fiction's most important writers."

References

Sources

External links
 The Martian Way and Other Stories at the Internet Speculative Fiction Database
 Possible Costs of Terraforming
  Research Paper: Technological Requirements for Terraforming Mars

Science fiction short story collections by Isaac Asimov
1955 short story collections
Doubleday (publisher) books